Christopher Aboué (born 12 March 1993) is a French footballer who currently plays as a forward.

References
Player Profile at SO Foot

1993 births
Living people
Association football forwards
French footballers
Amiens SC players
Ligue 2 players
Sportspeople from Fontainebleau
Footballers from Seine-et-Marne